Cajetan Roos (1690, Rome – 1770, Vienna), was an Italian landscape painter of German descent.

Biography

According to the RKD he was the son and pupil of Philipp Peter Roos. He signed his name "Rosa", "Gaetano Rosa" and "Gaetano de Rosa". He was the father of the painter Joseph Roos. Like his father and grandfather before him, he is known for Italianate landscapes with streams and cows, though after 1743-1744 he painted mostly religious works.

References

Gaetano de Rosa on Your paintings
Cajetan Roos on Artnet

1690 births
1770 deaths
18th-century Italian painters
Italian male painters
Italian landscape painters
18th-century German painters
18th-century German male artists
German male painters
Painters from Rome
18th-century Italian male artists